Xymene huttoni is a species of predatory sea snail, a marine gastropod mollusc in the family Muricidae, the rock snails or murex snails.

Distribution
This marine species is endemic to New Zealand.

References

 Murdoch, R. (1900) Descriptions of some new species of Pliocene Mollusca from the Wanganui District, with notes on other described species. Transactions and Proceedings of the New Zealand Institute, 32, 216–221, pl. 20.
 Powell A W B, New Zealand Mollusca, William Collins Publishers Ltd, Auckland, New Zealand 1979 

Gastropods of New Zealand
Gastropods described in 1900
Xymene